Abdennour Siouane (born September 12, 1989) is an Algerian football player who plays as a forward for NA Hussein Dey in the Algerian Ligue Professionnelle 2.

References

External links
 

1989 births
Living people
Algerian footballers
Algeria under-23 international footballers
NA Hussein Dey players
Algerian Ligue 2 players
USMM Hadjout players
Association football forwards
21st-century Algerian people